Paul Broster (born 31 January 1973) is an Australian former cricketer. He played two first-class cricket matches for Victoria between 1995 and 1996.

See also
 List of Victoria first-class cricketers

References

External links
 

1973 births
Living people
Australian cricketers
Victoria cricketers
People from Wangaratta